Kate Torney  is the CEO of the Peter MacCallum Cancer Foundation and was formerly the CEO of the State Library of Victoria from 2015 to 2021. She took over the CEO role of the library from Sue Roberts.

Torney was the ABC News (Australia) Director for the final six years of a 20-year career there, from 2009 to 2015. During this time, Torney oversaw the launch of ABC News 24. Before her role as Director, she had worked in a variety of roles, including as a radio and TV reporter, producer, bureau chief, executive producer and editor. Also the her she spent 25 years in journalism.

Torney is a member and former Chair of National and State Libraries Australia (NSLA), and serves on the board of The Conversation

Until two separate 2022 mass resignations amid major governance upheaval, she also served on the boards of Circus Oz, and the Judith Neilson Institute of Journalism and Ideasthe Judith Neilson Institute of Journalism and Ideas. 

She was formerly a member of the Ministerial Council for Volunteers and the Ministerial Council for the Creative State.

References

Year of birth missing (living people)
Living people
Australian women journalists
Australian journalists
Recipients of the Medal of the Order of Australia